Kristian Sæverås (born 22 June 1996) is a Norwegian handball player for SC DHfK Leipzig Handball and the Norwegian national team.

International honours
European Championship:
: 2020

References

External links
 
 
 
 

1996 births
Living people
Norwegian male handball players
Norwegian expatriate sportspeople in Denmark
Norwegian expatriate sportspeople in Germany
Norwegian expatriate sportspeople in Sweden
Expatriate handball players
People from Kolbotn
Handball-Bundesliga players
Handball players at the 2020 Summer Olympics
Handball players from Oslo
Olympic handball players of Norway